Manuel Francisco Cantero Jerez (born 27 September 1973), known as Manu, is a Spanish retired footballer who played as a goalkeeper. He was born in Badajoz, Extremadura.

External links

1973 births
Living people
Sportspeople from Badajoz
Spanish footballers
Footballers from Extremadura
Association football goalkeepers
Segunda División players
Segunda División B players
Tercera División players
CD Badajoz players
CP Mérida footballers
AD Ceuta footballers
Burgos CF footballers
CD Castellón footballers
Mérida UD footballers
Mérida AD players
Yeclano CF players